Mike Lazazzera is a television and video podcast personality. He is most noted for his appearances on the TV show Call For Help hosted by Leo Laporte, and for his collaborations with Amber MacArthur in video podcasting.

In August 2004, Lazazzera started working with Call For Help on G4techTV Canada as a Technical Assistant. Within six months he became the Technical Researcher. In October 2006 he started appearing on-air in various segments (including four on learning about Mac OS X). He also continued to assist hosts with research and production of segments. However, on November 27, 2006, Lazazzera announced on his blog that he and the rest of the Call For Help production team were being laid off, effective January 31, 2007, as the production of the program was being outsourced to another Canadian company.

Lazazzera has also been active in co-hosting online videos, especially podcasts. Starting in January 2005, he started doing regular Free File on-air segments alongside Amber MacArthur and Andy Walker. On June 28, 2005, MacArthur and Lazazzera released their first video podcast that they called This Week in Toronto (the name is a spoof of the popular podcast by Leo Laporte and various contributors called This Week in Tech), which was originally recorded and produced using an iSight Camera, a PowerBook, and Quicktime Recorder. The show later came to be known as commandN.

Episode 69 of commandN was his last episode as a regular host.

March 10, 2007, appeared in Digital Underground TV.

External links
Official site

Living people
Year of birth missing (living people)